Moustapha Abdoulaye Hima (born 1 January 1992) is a Nigerien boxer.   He competed for Niger in the 2012 Summer Olympics as a welterweight (69 kg).  Abdoulaye Hima was Niger's flag bearer in the opening ceremony. On 29 July Abdoulaye Hima lost a 6-13 points decision in the Round of 32 to Cameron Hammond of Australia.

See also
Niger at the 2012 Summer Olympics

References

1992 births
Living people
Welterweight boxers
Boxers at the 2012 Summer Olympics
Olympic boxers of Niger
Nigerien male boxers
Place of birth missing (living people)